Dolpo Buddha is a rural municipality located in Dolpa District of Karnali Province of Nepal. The rural municipality was formed by combining two existing VDCs Dho and Tinje. The rural municipality is located in the Upper Dolpo region (also known as Bhot).

The rural municipality is divided into total 6 wards and the headquarter of the rural municipality is situated at Dho.

Demographics
At the time of the 2011 Nepal census, 56.1% of the population in Dolpo Buddha Rural Municipality spoke Gurung, 41.9% Dolpali and 0.8% Kaike as their first language; 1.2% spoke other languages.

In terms of ethnicity/caste, 57.2% were Gurung, 41.3% Dolpo, 0.9% Magar and 0.6% others.

In terms of religion, 99.0% were Buddhist, 0.9% Hindu and 0.1% Christian.

References

External links
 Official website

Populated places in Dolpa District
Rural municipalities in Karnali Province
Rural municipalities of Nepal established in 2017